I'm on Your Side is the fourth album by Jennifer Holliday, released in 1991. The song "I'm On Your Side", a cover version of an Angela Bofill hit, was released as a single, peaking at number 10 on the Hot R&B/Hip-Hop Singles & Tracks. The second single, "Love Stories" peaked at number 29 on the Hot R&B/Hip-Hop Singles & Tracks. Clive Davis was the executive producer.

Track listing
"I'm on Your Side" (Angela Bofill, Jeffrey Cohen, Narada Michael Walden)
"It's in There" (Nicholas Ashford, Valerie Simpson)
"Raise the Roof" (Bernard Jackson, Brian Morgan, Shelly Morgan)
"A Dream with Your Name on It" (Bonnie Karlyle, Tom Lerner)
"Guilty" (Barry Eastmond, Jolyon Skinner)
"It Will Haunt Me" (Deborah Ash, Michael Campagne)
"Love Stories" (Gary Taylor)
"Is It Love" (Elliot Wolff, Oliver Leiber)
"I Fall Apart" (Diane Warren)
"More 'N' More" (Barry Eastmond, Jolyon Skinner)

Charts

References

1991 albums
Jennifer Holliday albums
Albums produced by Ashford & Simpson
Arista Records albums